(also transliterated as ) is the historical Arabic term for equestrian martial exercise. Furūsiyya “Knighthood” is a martial tradition dating back to Pre-Islamic Arabia 

Its main branches concerned horsemanship (including aspects of both hippology and equestrianism), horse archery and use of the lance, with the addition of swordsmanship as fourth branch in the 14th century.

The term is a derivation of  "horse", and in Modern Standard Arabic means "equestrianism" in general.

History 

Furusiyya literature, the Arabic literary tradition of veterinary medicine (hippiatry) and horsemanship, much like in the case of human medicine, was adopted wholesale from Byzantine Greek sources in the 9th to 10th centuries.

The first known such treatise in Arabic is due to Ibn Akhī Ḥizām, an Abbasid-era commander and stable master to caliph Al-Muʿtadid (r. 892–902), author of Kitāb al-Furūsiyya wa 'l-Bayṭara ("Book of Horsemanship and Hippiatry"). Ibn al-Nadim in the late 10th century records the availability in Baghdad of several treatises on horses and veterinary medicine attributed to Greek authors.

The discipline reaches its peak in Mamluk Egypt during the 14th century. In a narrow sense of the term, furūsiyya literature comprises works by professional military writers with a Mamluk background or close ties to the Mamluk establishment. These treatises often quote pre-Mamluk works on military strategy. Some of the works were versified for didactic purposes. The best known versified treatise is the one by Taybugha al-Baklamishi al-Yunani ("the Greek"), who in c. 1368 wrote the poem al-tullab fi ma'rifat ramy al-nushshab. By this time, the discipline of furusiyya becomes increasingly detached from its origins in Byzantine veterinary medicine and more focussed on military arts.

The three basic categories of furūsiyya are horsemanship (including veterinary aspects of proper care for the horse, the proper riding techniques), archery, and charging with the lance. Ibn Qayyim al-Jawziyya adds swordsmanship as a fourth discipline in his treatise Al-Furūsiyya (1350). Ibn Akhi Hizam also cited that there are three fundamentals to the furūsiyya: horse mastery, proficiency in handling all types of weapons, and bravery.

Persian  which can be dated with confidence are extant only from about the mid-14th century, but the tradition survives longer in Persia, throughout the Safavid era. One treatise by ʿAbd-Allāh Ṣafī, known as the a (written in 1407/8) is said to preserve a chapter from an otherwise lost 12th-century (Ghaznavid-era) text. There is a candidate for another treatise of this age, extant in a single manuscript: the treatise attributed to one Moḥammad b. Moḥammad b. Zangī, also known as Qayyem Nehāvandī, has been tentatively dated as originating in the 12th century. Some of the Persian treatises are translations from the Arabic. One short work, attributed to Aristotle, is a Persian translation from the Arabic. There are supposedly also treatises translated into Persian from Hindustani or Sanskrit. Zebardast Khan (written 1722/3). Moḥammad Wāseʿī (written 1365/6; Tehran,  MS no. 5754). A partial listing of known Persian  literature was published by Gordfarāmarzī (1987).

List of Furusiyyah treatises 
The following is a list of known Furusiyyah treatises (after al-Sarraf 2004, al-Nashīrī 2007).

Some of the early treatises (9th to 10th centuries) are not extant and only known from references by later authors:  Al-Asma'i,  (خيل "horse"), Ibn Abi al-Dunya  (d. 894 / AH 281) , Al-Ṭabarānī (d. 971 / AH 360) ,  Al-Qarrāb  (d. 1038 / AH 429), .

Fāris 

The term furūsiyya, much like its parallel chivalry in the West, also appears to have developed a wider meaning of "martial ethos". Arabic furusiyya and European chivalry has both influenced each other as a means of a warrior code for the knights of both cultures.

The term fāris for "horseman" consequently adopted qualities comparable to the Western knight or chevalier ("cavalier"). This could include free men (such as Usama ibn Munqidh), or unfree professional warriors, like ghulams and mamluks). The Mamluk-era soldier was trained in the use of various weapons such as the saif, spear, lance, javelin, club, bow and arrows and tabarzin or axe (hence Mamluk bodyguards known as tabardariyya), as well as wrestling.

See also 

 Hippiatrica
 Shalihotra Samhita
 Bem cavalgar
 History of veterinary medicine
 Horses in the Middle Ages
 Horses in warfare
 Aswaran
 Futuwwa
 Ayyār

References

Bibliography 
 Ayalon, David (1961). Notes on the Furusiyya Exercises and Games in the Mamluk Sultanate, Scripta Hierosolymitana, 9
 Bashir, Mohamed (2008). The arts of the Muslim knight; the Furusiyya Art Foundation collection. Skira. 
 
 Nicolle, David (1999). Arms & Armour of the Crusading Era 1050–1350, Islam, Eastern Europe, and Asia. Greenhill Books. 
 
 Housni Alkhateeb Shehada, Mamluks and Animals: Veterinary Medicine in Medieval Islam (2012).
 Waterson, James (2007). The Knights of Islam: The Wars of the Mamluks. Greenhill Books.

External links 

 Mamluk Bibliography Online
 Qatar Digital Library

Historical martial arts
Military history of Islam
History of veterinary medicine
Military equestrianism
Culture of the medieval Islamic world
Mamluk Sultanate
Warrior code